Fatih Erdin (born February 1, 1994) is a Turkish freestyle wrestler competing in the 86 kg division. He is a member of İstanbul Büyükşehir Belediyesi S.K. He qualified to the final game of 2018 World Wrestling Championships which was held in Budapest, Hungary on 20 and 21 October 2018 and won the silver medal.

Fatih Erdin participated in 2018 Ivan Yargyin Grand-Prix competition, where he could cussussfully obtain a silver medal. He defeated Zaur Beradze, Almas Zhunis and Vladislav Valiev to reach the final where he lost to american champion David Taylor.

Fatih Erdin also won a silver medal in 2014 Dmitri Korkin Tournament in Russia, a gold medal in 2011 Poland Cadets European Championship, a silver in 2019 Ivan Yargyin Grand-Prix, a gold medal in G. Kartozia & V. Balavadze Price in Georgia, a bronze medal in 2018 Alexander Medved Prizes and a bronze medal in 2018 Yaşar Doğu competition.

He won the silver medal in the 86 kg event at the 2022 Mediterranean Games held in Oran, Algeria. He competed in the 86kg event at the 2022 World Wrestling Championships held in Belgrade, Serbia.

References

External links
 

1994 births
Turkish male sport wrestlers
Living people
Wrestlers at the 2019 European Games
European Games competitors for Turkey
World Wrestling Championships medalists
European Wrestling Championships medalists
Mediterranean Games silver medalists for Turkey
Mediterranean Games medalists in wrestling
Competitors at the 2022 Mediterranean Games
21st-century Turkish people